Williamsfield is a settlement in Manchester Parish, Jamaica.

Williamsfield Estate

Williamsfield gets its name from the Williamsfield Estate which was a sugar plantation first established in the 1740s:
"according to what can be gathered from the old negroes (there being no early records), was first settled, nearly eighty years ago, by Mr. Needham, who was at that time a large proprietor in the Island; but while in its infancy (within three or four years after it was commenced), it was purchased by a Mr. Harvey, who came from Barbadoes, and was a merchant in Kingston"

Demography
It has a population of 3,299 as of 2009.

Notes

References

Populated places in Manchester Parish